John Newcombe and Tony Roche were the defending champions but did not compete that year.

Dick Crealy and Allan Stone won in the final 10–8, 6–4, 6–3 against Terry Addison and Ray Keldie.

Seeds
Champion seeds are indicated in bold text while text in italics indicates the round in which those seeds were eliminated. The top two seeded teams received byes into the second round.

Draw

Final

Top half

Bottom half

External links
 1968 Australian Championships – Men's draws and results at the International Tennis Federation

1968 in Australian tennis
Men's Doubles